Memory cell may refer to:

Biology
 Memory cells (motor cortex), found in the primary motor cortex (M1), a region located in the posterior portion of the frontal lobe of the brain. 
 Memory B cell, an antibody producing cell
 Memory T cell, an infection fighting cell

Computing
 Memory cell (computing), a building block of computer memory and data storage